Ennodius orientalis is a species of leaf beetle of East Africa and the Democratic Republic of the Congo. It was first described by Heinrich Kuntzen in 1912.

References 

Eumolpinae
Beetles of the Democratic Republic of the Congo
Beetles described in 1912
Insects of East Africa